The 2015 Open de Guadeloupe was a professional tennis tournament played on hard courts. It was the fifth edition of the tournament which was part of the 2015 ATP Challenger Tour. It took place in Le Gosier, Guadeloupe between 30 March and 5 April 2015.

Singles main-draw entrants

Seeds

 1 Rankings are as of 23 March 2015.

Other entrants
The following players received wildcards into the singles main draw:
  Grégoire Barrère
  Calvin Hemery
  Fabrice Martin
  Laurent Rochette

The following players got into the singles main draw as an alternate:
  Filip Horanský
  Ivo Klec

The following players received entry from the qualifying draw:
  Henrique Cunha
  Omar Jasika	
  Wesley Koolhof
  Matwé Middelkoop

Doubles main-draw entrants

Seeds

Other entrants
The following pairs received wildcards into the doubles main draw:
 Nicolas Ancedy /  Victor Girat Magin

Champions

Singles 

 Ruben Bemelmans def.  Édouard Roger-Vasselin, 7–6(8–6), 6–3

Doubles 

  James Cerretani /  Antal van der Duim def.  Wesley Koolhof /  Matwé Middelkoop, 6–1, 6–3

External links
Official Website

Open de Guadeloupe
Open de Guadeloupe
2015 in French tennis
2015 in Guadeloupean sport